The men's 400 metre freestyle event at the 2002 Commonwealth Games took place 30 July. Both the heats and final were held on 30 July.

Records
Prior to this competition, the existing records were as follows;

The following records were established during the competition:

Results

Final

Key: WR = World record

Preliminaries

References

Retrieved 2010-01-21
Retrieved 2010-01-21

Swimming at the 2002 Commonwealth Games